The 2010 Winter Olympics Torch Relay was a 106-day run, from October 30, 2009 until February 12, 2010, prior to the 2010 Winter Olympics. Plans for the relay were originally announced November 21, 2008 by the Vancouver Organizing Committee for the 2010 Olympic and Paralympic Winter Games (VANOC). Communities were initially informed in June 2008, but the locations were not announced for "security reasons". Exact routes were later announced several weeks before the start of the torch relay.

The torches used in the Olympic relay were designed by Leo Obstbaum (1969–2009), the late director of design for the 2010 Winter Games.
 
There were an estimated 12,000 torchbearers, including notable Canadian celebrities such as Shania Twain, Simon Whitfield, Silken Lauman, Alexandre Despatie, Catriona Le May Doan and John Hayman and past and present NHL hockey stars including Sidney Crosby, Wayne Gretzky, and the captains of the Vancouver Canucks teams that went to the Stanley Cup Finals, Trevor Linden and Stan Smyl. In fact, many television personalities were selected as torchbearers for the relay, mainly from CTV's parent company, CTVglobemedia. Matt Lauer and American actor, bodybuilder, and former California Governor Arnold Schwarzenegger were also torch bearers.

On 22 October 2009 the Olympic Torch was lit during a ceremony held at the Ancient Olympia in Greece. Actress Maria Nafpliotou played the role of the High Priestess and ignited the flame using a parabolic mirror and the sun's ray. The first torch was carried by Olympic skier Vassilis Dimitriadis.

Kept under close secrecy, the final Olympic Torchbearer turned out to be not one, but five final torchbearers. Rick Hansen brought it into BC Place Stadium, in turn lighting Catriona Le May Doan's torch, who lit Steve Nash's torch, and the flame continued to Nancy Greene and Wayne Gretzky. Three of the four torchbearers lit the indoor Olympic Cauldron; Le May Doan remained with her torch due to a malfunction causing only three of the four arms to be raised.  Gretzky exited BC Place, with his torch still lit, and caught a ride on the back of a VANOC vehicle, to Coal Harbour, where he lit the outdoor Cauldron. This makes Gretzky the first person to light two official cauldrons in the same Olympics.

At the start of the closing ceremony, Le May Doan re-lit the indoor Cauldron after clown and mime Yves Dagenais "fixed" and "raised" the arm that malfunctioned in the opening ceremony.

Relay elements

Torch

The torches used for 2010 relay and the lighting ceremonies were made by designers at Bombardier Inc.'s Aerospace division.

Route

 Before October 30: Olympia, Greece
 October 30: Victoria, British Columbia loop
 October 31: Victoria to Nanaimo
 November 1: Nanaimo to Tofino
 November 2: Tofino to Courtenay to Campbell River
 November 3: Campbell River to Whitehorse, Yukon
 November 4: Whitehorse to Inuvik, Northwest Territories
 November 5: Inuvik to Yellowknife, briefly entering Nunavut
 November 6: Yellowknife to Cold Lake, Alberta
 November 7: Cold Lake to Churchill, Manitoba, going through Saskatchewan
 November 8: Churchill to Alert, Nunavut
 November 9: Alert to Iqaluit
 November 10: Iqaluit to Gaspé, Quebec
 November 11: Sept-Îles to Labrador City, Newfoundland and Labrador to Happy Valley-Goose Bay, Newfoundland and Labrador
 November 12: Happy Valley-Goose Bay to St. John's
 November 13: St. John's loop
 November 14: St. John's to Grand Falls-Windsor
 November 15: Grand Falls-Windsor to Channel-Port aux Basques
 November 16: Channel-Port aux Basques to Port Hawkesbury, Nova Scotia
 November 17: Port Hawkesbury to Truro
 November 18: Truro to Halifax, Nova Scotia
 November 19: Halifax loop
 November 20: Halifax to Lunenburg
 November 21: Lunenburg to Charlottetown, Prince Edward Island
 November 22: Charlottetown to Summerside
 November 23: Summerside to Moncton, New Brunswick
 November 24: Moncton to Saint John
 November 25: Saint John to Fredericton
 November 26: Not travelling, staying in Fredericton.
 November 27: Fredericton to Bathurst
 November 28: Bathurst to Edmundston
 November 29: Edmundston to Rimouski, Quebec
 November 30: Rimouski to Baie-Comeau, Quebec
 December 1: Baie-Comeau to Saguenay(Alma)
 December 2: Saguenay to Quebec City
 December 3: Quebec City to Lévis
 December 4: Lévis to Saint-Georges
 December 5: Saint-Georges to Sherbrooke
 December 6: Sherbrooke to Trois-Rivières
 December 7: Trois-Rivières to Longueuil
 December 8: Longueuil to Beaconsfield
 December 8: Beaconsfield to Kahnawake
 December 9: Kahnawake to Mont-Tremblant
 December 10: Mont-Tremblant to Montreal
 December 11: Montreal to Gatineau
 December 12: Gatineau to Ottawa, Ontario
 December 13: Ottawa loop
 December 14: Ottawa to Kingston
 December 15: Kingston to Peterborough
 December 16: Peterborough to Oshawa
 December 17: Oshawa to Toronto
 December 18: Toronto to Brampton
 December 19: Brampton to Hamilton
 December 20: Hamilton to Niagara Falls
 December 21: Niagara Falls to Brantford
 December 22: Brantford to Chatham
 December 23: Chatham to Windsor
 December 24: Windsor to London
 December 25: Not travelling, staying in London.
 December 26: Not travelling, staying in London.
 December 27: London to Kitchener
 December 28: Kitchener to Owen Sound
 December 29: Owen Sound to Barrie
 December 30: Barrie to North Bay
 December 31: North Bay to Val-d'Or, Quebec
 January 1, 2010: Val-d'Or to Timmins, Ontario
 January 2: Timmins to Sault Ste. Marie
 January 3: Sault Ste. Marie to Thunder Bay
 January 4: Thunder Bay to Kenora
 January 5: Kenora to Winnipeg, Manitoba
 January 6: Winnipeg loop
 January 7: Winnipeg to Portage la Prairie
 January 8: Portage la Prairie to Brandon
 January 9: Brandon to Regina
 January 10: Regina to Swift Current
 January 11: Swift Current to Saskatoon to Prince Albert
 January 12: Prince Albert to Lloydminster
 January 13: Lloydminster to Edmonton, Alberta
 January 14: Not travelling, staying in Edmonton.
 January 15: Edmonton to Red Deer
 January 16: Red Deer to Medicine Hat
 January 17: Medicine Hat to Lethbridge
 January 18: Lethbridge to Crossfield
 January 19: Calgary to Airdrie
 January 20: Calgary to Banff
 January 21: Banff to Golden, British Columbia
 January 22: Golden to Cranbrook
 January 23: Cranbrook to Nelson
 January 24: Nelson to Osoyoos
 January 25: Osoyoos to Kelowna
 January 26: Kelowna to Revelstoke
 January 27: Revelstoke to Kamloops
 January 28: Kamloops to Williams Lake
 January 29: Williams Lake to Prince George
 January 30: Prince George to Smithers
 January 31: Smithers to Fort St. John
 February 1: Fort St. John to Prince Rupert
 February 2: Prince Rupert to Port Hardy
 February 3: Port Hardy to Powell River
 February 4: Powell River to Squamish
 February 5: Squamish to Whistler
 February 6: Whistler to Merritt
 February 7: Merritt to Abbotsford
 February 8: Abbotsford to Surrey
 February 9: Surrey to Richmond (The torch briefly went into the United States at the Peace Arch in Surrey, British Columbia and Blaine, Washington)
 February 10: Richmond to West Vancouver, British Columbia
 February 11: West Vancouver to Vancouver
 February 12: Within Vancouver to BC Place Stadium

See also
2010 Winter Paralympics torch relay

References

External links

 "Provincial and territorial routes", Vancouver 2010 official site, listing the exact stops on the tour.
 TorchRelay.net – Torch Relay coverage. Includes torchbearer profiles, photos, videos, and more
 "Olympic torch cheered in Mohawk community", CBC ''.

Olympic torch relays
Torch relay